Adrian Bukowski (born 18 March 2003) is a Polish professional footballer who plays as a central midfielder for Śląsk Wrocław.

Career statistics

Club

References

External links

2003 births
Living people
Polish footballers
Association football midfielders
Zagłębie Lubin players
Śląsk Wrocław players
Ekstraklasa players
II liga players
III liga players
Poland youth international footballers